Harry Pickens is an American jazz pianist.   He began his career with the Blue Note Records group Out of the Blue before releasing several albums as leader.

Pickens has been a mainstay feature at the Idyllwild Arts Jazz in the Pines festival each year in August through 2018, with the West Coast version of the Harry Pickens Trio comprising Pickens, Marshall Hawkins (bass) and Harold Mason (drums).

According to his website, Pickens has collaborated with:  John Abercrombie, Eric Alexander, David Baker, Keter Betts, Art Blakey, Terrence Blanchard, Don Braden, Avery Brooks, Conte Candoli, Pete Candoli, Ron Carter, Jerry Coker, Buddy Collette, Todd Coolman, Eddie "Lockjaw" Davis, Lou Donaldson, Ted Dunbar, Harry "Sweets" Edison, Yve Evans, Jon Faddis, Art Farmer, Ricky Ford, Chico Freeman, Curtis Fuller, Kenny Garrett, Dizzy Gillespie, Benny Golson, Slide Hampton, Marshall Hawkins, Jeff Hamilton, Scott Hamilton, Joe Henderson, Billy Higgins, Freddie Hubbard, Robert Hurst, Bobby Hutcherson, Milt Jackson, Herb Jeffreys, Clifford Jordan, Dave Liebman, Marian McPartland, Delfeayo Marsalis, Cecil McBee, Jackie McLean, Charles McPherson, James Moody, Lewis Nash, Jack Petersen, Ralph Peterson, Marcus Printup, Rufus Reid, Wallace Roney, Lynn Seaton, Bobby Shew, Marvin "Smitty" Smith, James Spaulding, Byron Stripling, Steve Turre, Freddie Waits, Kenny Washington, Bobby Watson, Sharrie Williams, Phil Woods.

Discography 
 Very Early with Alexis Cole (CD Baby, 1999)
 I'll Be Seeing You (Harry Pickens Music, 2003)

References

External links
Amazon

American jazz pianists
American male pianists
Living people
21st-century American pianists
21st-century American male musicians
American male jazz musicians
Year of birth missing (living people)
Out of the Blue (American band) members
Double-Time Records artists